Tridrepana bicuspidata is a moth in the family Drepanidae. It was first described by Song, Xue and Han in 2011. It is found in Hainan, China.

References

Moths described in 2011
Drepaninae